Streptomyces phaeochromogenes is a bacterium species from the genus of Streptomyces. Streptomyces phaeochromogenes produces tyrosinate, bromoperoxidase, ditryptophenalin, phaeochromycin A, phaeochromycin B, phaeochromycin C, phaeochromycin D and phaeochromycin E. Streptomyces phaeochromogenes also produces moenomycin and bambermycin.

Further reading

See also 
 List of Streptomyces species

References

External links
Type strain of Streptomyces phaeochromogenes at BacDive -  the Bacterial Diversity Metadatabase	

phaeochromogenes
Bacteria described in 1957